The 1949 Oklahoma Sooners football team represented the University of Oklahoma in the 1949 college football season. In their third year under head coach Bud Wilkinson, the Sooners compiled an undefeated 11–0 record (5–0 against conference opponents), won the Big Six Conference championship, were ranked #2 in the final AP Poll, and outscored their opponents by a combined total of 399 to 88.

Five Sooners received All-America honors in 1949: Jim Owens (end), Darrell Royal (quarterback), George Thomas (halfback), Wade Walker (tackle) and Stanley West (guard). The same five players also received all-conference honors.

Schedule

Roster
Claude Arnold
QB Darrell Royal (#11)
Gene Heape

Rankings

Postseason

NFL Draft
Six Sooners were selected in the 1950 NFL Draft, held in January.

 End Jim Owens was selected in the 1949 NFL Draft.

References

Oklahoma
Oklahoma Sooners football seasons
Big Eight Conference football champion seasons
Sugar Bowl champion seasons
College football undefeated seasons
Oklahoma Sooners football